Wildwood Lake is a census-designated place (CDP) in Bradley County, Tennessee, United States. The population was 3,286 at the 2020 Census. It is included in the Cleveland, Tennessee Metropolitan Statistical Area.

Geography
Wildwood Lake is located at  (35.104121, -84.858645).

Wildwood Lake is situated approximately four miles southeast of downtown Cleveland. It is bordered by State Route 60 (Dalton Pike) on the west and State Route 74 (Spring Place Road) on the east. APD-40 and State Route 313 (Ladd Springs Road) are also major connectors to the community.

Demographics

2020 census

As of the 2020 United States census, there were 3,286 people, 1,309 households, and 1,022 families residing in the CDP.

2000 census
As of the census of 2000, there were 3,050 people, 1,195 households, and 910 families residing in the CDP. The population density was 254.3 people per square mile (98.2/km2). There were 1,261 housing units at an average density of 105.1/sq mi (40.6/km2). The racial makeup of the CDP was 97.67% White, 0.82% African American, 0.07% Native American, 0.20% Asian, 0.59% from other races, and 0.66% from two or more races. Hispanic or Latino of any race were 0.85% of the population.

There were 1,195 households, out of which 32.1% had children under the age of 18 living with them, 63.6% were married couples living together, 8.1% had a female householder with no husband present, and 23.8% were non-families. 20.3% of all households were made up of individuals, and 8.2% had someone living alone who was 65 years of age or older. The average household size was 2.55 and the average family size was 2.91.

In the CDP, the population was spread out, with 23.6% under the age of 18, 8.6% from 18 to 24, 31.3% from 25 to 44, 24.9% from 45 to 64, and 11.5% who were 65 years of age or older. The median age was 37 years. For every 100 females, there were 100.7 males. For every 100 females age 18 and over, there were 94.7 males.

The median income for a household in the CDP was $37,708, and the median income for a family was $41,357. Males had a median income of $29,344 versus $21,484 for females. The per capita income for the CDP was $16,191. About 8.9% of families and 9.2% of the population were below the poverty line, including 15.4% of those under age 18 and 9.2% of those age 65 or over.

References

Census-designated places in Bradley County, Tennessee
Census-designated places in Tennessee
Cleveland metropolitan area, Tennessee